Joshua Perkins (born August 5, 1993) is an American football tight end for the Seattle Sea Dragons of the XFL. He played college football at Washington and was signed by the Atlanta Falcons as an undrafted free agent in 2016.

Professional career

Atlanta Falcons
After going undrafted in the 2016 NFL Draft, Perkins signed with the Atlanta Falcons on May 5, 2016. He made his first start in Week 16 against their NFC South rival Carolina Panthers and caught his first career touchdown on a 26-yard pass from Matt Ryan.

Perkins and the Falcons reached Super Bowl LI, where they faced the  New England Patriots. In the Super Bowl, the Falcons fell in a 34–28 overtime defeat.

On September 2, 2017, Perkins was waived by the Falcons and was signed to their practice squad the next day. He was placed on the practice squad/injured list on October 11, 2017. He was released on January 10, 2018.

Philadelphia Eagles
On January 15, 2018, Perkins signed a reserve/future contract with the Philadelphia Eagles. He played in nine games in 2018 before being placed on injured reserve on November 16, 2018.

Perkins was waived during final roster cuts on August 31, 2019, but was re-signed to the team's practice squad the next day. He was promoted to the team's active roster on November 30, 2019. On December 9, Perkins had five catches for 37 yards against the New York Giants, including a 13-yard catch in overtime. In week 17 of the 2019 season Perkins caught his first touchdown since 2016 after catching a 24 yard touchdown pass from quarterback Carson Wentz, the touchdown pass helped the Eagles win 34-17 over the Giants and capture the NFC East title while Perkins finished the game catching 4 passes for a touchdown, and 50 yards.

On August 26, 2020, Perkins was placed on injured reserve.

San Francisco 49ers
On August 4, 2021, Perkins signed a one-year contract with the San Francisco 49ers. Perkins was released on August 17, 2021.

New York Jets
On December 29, 2021, Perkins was signed to the New York Jets practice squad.

Seattle Sea Dragons 
On November 17, 2022, Perkins was drafted by the Seattle Sea Dragons of the XFL.

References

External links

 Washington Huskies bio

1993 births
Living people
American football tight ends
People from Carson, California
Atlanta Falcons players
New York Jets players
Philadelphia Eagles players
San Francisco 49ers players
Seattle Sea Dragons players
Players of American football from California
Sportspeople from Los Angeles County, California
Washington Huskies football players